Matthew Joseph Cable is a character appearing in DC Comics' Swamp Thing series. Introduced in Swamp Thing (Volume 1) in November 1972, he dies and is later resurrected as Dream's raven in Neil Gaiman's rendition of The Sandman.

Henderson Wade played Matt Cable in the television series based on the comic book series of the same name for the DC streaming service.

Fictional character biography

Swamp Thing/Doom Patrol
Matthew Cable was a government agent assigned to protect Alec and Linda Holland as they worked on their bio-restorative formula deep in the Louisiana bayou. Cable was unable to save them from the machinations of the Conclave, a sinister organization that wanted the couple to work for its own nefarious ends, and the Hollands were killed. When the Swamp Thing rose from the bayou, Cable believed it was responsible for the Hollands' deaths and set out to avenge his friends' murders. Cable's search took him through the Balkans, where he met Abigail Arcane, niece to Anton Arcane, a ruthless man who wanted the Swamp Thing's body so he could become immortal. For years, the Swamp Thing believed himself to be Holland, and eventually revealed to Cable that he was "Alec," which led Cable to let him go. Cable and Abigail would later marry and settle in Houma, Louisiana, near the Swamp Thing.

Cable encountered the Doom Patrol during this time (in the 1977 Showcase series) as well.

Eventually, Cable's mind became damaged, which gave him the ability to alter reality. Consequently, his marriage with Abigail began to deteriorate, leading Cable to abuse his power; he created decaying forms to arouse and please him through obscene, sexual acts, which would strain his marriage even further. Cable only seemed to be able to access his power while stressed or intoxicated.

After a fight with Abigail that culminates in her leaving to find the Swamp Thing, Cable has an attack of conscience and drives after her. Having been drinking heavily, he ends up crashing his car, mortally wounding himself. A huge, unnatural fly landed by him and offered to revive Cable, to which he agrees, allowing it to crawl down his throat. In reality, Anton Arcane, who had since died and gone to Hell, finds a way out by way of Cable. He possesses the fly and then Cable's body, and with it gains Cable's godlike power. Eventually, Cable manages to send Arcane back to Hell, but at the cost of the effects of the car crash catching up with him, and only after Arcane had molested and killed Abigail (the plot point, incidentally, that resulted in DC dropping the Comics Code Authority seal on Swamp Thing for good with issue #31 and Swamp Thing Annual #2, adding instead the words "Sophisticated Suspense" across the top). Still possessing enough power to repair one body and not wanting to live, Cable manages to bring Abigail back to life (though her soul would still have to be rescued from Hell by the Swamp Thing, who succeeds in doing so). Apologizing to "Alec," he then falls into a coma.

After lessons learned within the Dreaming while comatose (and in an effort to help Abigail move on), an emaciated Cable rises one final time and destroys the machinery sustaining him, thus ending his life.

Morpheus's Raven
Since Cable technically died while in the Dreaming, Morpheus/Dream of the Endless revived him to a form of life as his Raven. This is truer than Cable first suspected ("I suppose I figured I'd be a man in a raven's body. Nope, it don't work like that. I'm a raven"). He lives with Eve in Dream's domain. His purpose, and the purpose of all the Ravens that Morpheus had previously, is somewhat questionable. Morpheus seems to keep the Ravens around out of some sort of unspoken need for companionship. The Ravens are created by Morpheus, offering the position to people who died, usually while dreaming, and releasing them from service if they so wish.

Cable is irreverent and somewhat crude, having left a questionable life behind him. However, he served Dream loyally by providing advice and occasionally going on missions for him. His loyalty extended so far that when Morpheus was slain, he at first was going to seek release from service to Daniel, who had taken Morpheus's place as Dream. He eventually decided to stay on as Daniel's Raven.

In the Dreaming series, Matthew plays a more important role and is often teamed with the Corinthian. He dies twice more during the series, once as a result of being tricked by the Coyote and for the final time by an accidental shot from Lucien during a fight with Echo and Eblis O'Shaughnessy. He comes back briefly to tell Daniel not to let Lucien blame himself. In the most recent versions of The Dreaming by Simon Spurrier and continued by G. Willow Wilson, Matthew the Raven is very much alive, and there is no acknowledgment of the events from Caitlin R. Kiernan's version of The Dreaming, which has not been published since 2011.

Other Ravens
Notable predecessors of the Raven are Lucien, who was the first Raven, and Aristeas of Marmora, who centuries later returned to his life as a man for one year. Disturbingly, when Delirium tries to recall the other of Dream's Ravens she had seen, she mentions "eleven and a half." Other predecessors mentioned are Jessamy, Francois, Jehuda, Vivien, Ming-Ti, Dechtire, and Hatshepsut. After Cable's death, Daniel enlists Tethys, a deep-sea creature who had dreamed of the surface world, to serve him as a White Raven.

In other media

Television
 Matt Cable appears in Swamp Thing (2019), portrayed by Henderson Wade. This version is a Louisiana police officer whose mother Lucilia is the town's sheriff. He is also a childhood friend of Abby Arcane, in whom he has a romantic interest. In contrast to his comic counterpart, he is responsible for the murder of Alec Holland, which he carries out on the orders of businessman Avery Sunderland, who is later revealed by Lucilla to be Cable's biological father. The final scene of the series depicts Cable being attacked by a mutated Jason Woodrue, leaving his fate unknown.
 Matthew the Raven appears in The Sandman, voiced by Patton Oswalt.

Film
In the Swamp Thing film, the character of Alice Cable (played by Adrienne Barbeau) is loosely based on Abby Holland - basically an amalgam of her and Matthew Cable. She is portrayed as a government agent who falls in love with Alec Holland, a.k.a. the Swamp Thing.

Audio
In the Audible adaptation of the series, Matthew was voiced by Andy Serkis.

See also
 List of characters in The Sandman

External links
 Roots of the Swamp Thing - An extremely detailed timeline chronicling all the events of Swamp Thing, Hellblazer and related titles in chronological order, covering the life of Matthew Cable.

References

Fictional ravens
Fictional American secret agents
DC Comics characters who use magic
Mythology in DC Comics
The Sandman (comic book)
Comics characters introduced in 1972
Comics characters introduced in 1989
Characters created by Len Wein